Canzoni or canzone is an Italian or Provençal song or ballad.

Canzoni may also refer to:
Canzoni (Fabrizio De André album), 1974
Canzoni (Lucio Dalla album), 1996
Canzoni, a 1990 album by Mietta, or the title song
Canzoni, a 2014 album by Chiara Civello